Dora Söderberg (10 November 1899 – 9 November 1990) was a Swedish stage, film, and television actress.

Daughter of the famous Swedish novelist and playwright Hjalmar Söderberg.

Dora Söderberg was a highly acclaimed character actress and a longtime member of Sweden's national stage, the Royal Dramatic Theatre-ensemble (1935–1986), where she acted in more than 80 productions. She trained at the Royal Dramatic Training Academy from 1917 to 1919.

Dora Söderberg was married to Swedish theatre- and film director Rune Carlstén.

Sometimes credited as Dora Carlstén or Dora Söderberg-Carlstén.

Source and references
Actors encyclopedia "Svenska konstnärer inom scen, musik och film"; Dora Söderberg; Bonniers; (1943) (Sweden)
Om igen, herr Molander! by Ingrid Luterkort, Stockholmia Förlag, Borås, Sweden, 1998 (list; students at the Royal Dramatic Training Academy)
Dora Söderberg - Rollboken - at Dramaten.se (list of stage credits at The Royal Dramatic Theatre).

External links

1899 births
1990 deaths
Swedish stage actresses
Swedish film actresses
Swedish silent film actresses
Swedish television actresses
Actresses from Stockholm
20th-century Swedish actresses